Jennifer Don (born October 6, 1984) is a Taiwanese American figure skater who competed in both the pairs and singles disciplines. For  most of her career, she represented the United States in competition. With partner Jonathon Hunt, she is the 2003 World Junior bronze medalist in pairs. As a single skater, she won the 2003 Nebelhorn Trophy, becoming the first woman to win a competition under the ISU International Judging System. In 2006, she represented Chinese Taipei. Jennifer is a PSA member and CER A certified.

Personal life 
Don was born on October 6, 1984, in Houston, Texas. She graduated from the University of California, Los Angeles (UCLA) in 2009, where she earned a bachelor's degree in Global Studies.

Skating career 
Don started skating at the age of 10. As a singles skater, she was the 2001 U.S. national bronze medalist on the novice level and the 2002 U.S. silver medalist on the junior level.

As a pair skater, Don won the bronze medal with Jonathon Hunt at the 2003 World Junior Championships. They announced the end of their partnership in March 2005, Hunt having decided to retire. Don was unable to find another partner so she decided to compete as a single skater for Taiwan. In 2005, she won the Chinese Taipei National Championships.

Programs

Singles

Pairs

With Hunt

Results
GP: Grand Prix; JGP: Junior Grand Prix

Single skating
For the United States until 2004 and then Chinese Taipei (Taiwan)

Pairs with Guzman

Pairs with Hunt

References

External links 

 
 
 Jump Elements

1984 births
Living people
American female single skaters
American female pair skaters
Figure skaters at the 2007 Winter Universiade
People from Houston
Taiwanese female single skaters
World Junior Figure Skating Championships medalists
21st-century American women